Lake Ambadi is a lake of South Sudan. It forms one of the world's largest wetlands, and is home to large numbers of the rare Shoebill.

References

Lakes of South Sudan